"Celebration" is a song by American rapper Game featuring fellow American rappers Tyga, Wiz Khalifa, & Lil Wayne and  American singer Chris Brown, released as the lead single from the former's fifth studio album Jesus Piece. "Celebration" premiered on Los Angeles' Power 106 on August 22, 2012. The song samples Bone Thugs-n-Harmony's hit single "1st of tha Month", which in return samples the Chapter 8 and Anita Baker song  "I Just Want to Be Your Girl".

Production and recording
Celebration was written by Game (credited as Jayceon Taylor), Lil Wayne, Tyga, Chris Brown and Wiz Khalifa. Production of the song was handled by Cool and Dre and their protégé SAP. Celebration samples Bone Thugs-n-Harmony's hit 1st of tha Month produced by DJ U-Neek. Game said in an interview that in his entire career he tried to flip 1st of tha Month without taking too much of the original.
"I grew up in Compton, California, and I'm a huge fan of Bone Thugs-n-Harmony. This is my fifth album, and my whole career I've been trying to figure out how to flip '1st of Tha Month' and I finally did it," Game told us on Friday while taking a break from filming the song's video. "I wanted to keep the feel of the song without taking too much of the original."
 Initially Wiz Khalifa was not featured in the song; therefore, he has a short verse. In the clean version of the song, available on iTunes, the hook sings "We havin' a celebration / Let us stay fly" instead of "We havin' a celebration / Let us stay high" on the first time only.

In an early version of the song, Game says he's "scoopin' up Drake and hittin' the freeway" instead of "scoopin' up Chris." "Drake" was replaced with "Chris" on the album version due to the feud between the two artists that had erupted a few months after the song was recorded. This version of the song also does not have a verse from Wiz Khalifa.

Critical reception
David Jeffries from Allmusic wrote: "The breezy and nostalgic closer "Celebration" feels more like a Sunday picnic than a Sunday sermon." Pitchfork called this song "catchy Bone Thugs redux." Jon Dolan called this song "redemptive." USA Today listed this song in Download This list. XXL was positive: "Most instrumentals on the record are, appropriately, soulful but not identical, as highlights more thump, such as the album's first single "Celebration."

Chart performance
"Celebration" managed to attain chart success, debuted and peaked at number 82 on the Billboard Hot 100, number 22 on US Rhythmic chart and number 24 on the Hot Hip-Hop/R&B chart. Lil Wayne's contribution earned him his 109th chart entry, surpassing Elvis Presley's record for the most chart entries. It re-entered the Billboard Hot 100 on the week of November 22, 2012 at number 100. The song spent a total of 12 weeks on the Hot 100 and 20 weeks on the Hip-Hop/R&B chart.

Music video
The music video was directed by Matt Alonzo and produced by Tara Razavi, Michael Busalacchi and KeElviyn Craver. Game told MTV news that fans could expect a similar feel and visual from his mentor Dr. Dre's hit single Nuthin' but a 'G' Thang (featuring Snoop Doggy Dogg). "The concept of the video is Nuthin' but a 'G' Thang my videos, I don't like them to be fake or feel like anybody gotta act, so we're really having a barbecue out here," Game said. "It's real food, it ain't no prop food, it's real water guns — everything real." Game, Chris Brown, Tyga, Lil Wayne and Wiz Khalifa all appear in the video performing their part of the song. Game's son Harlem and Warren G are cameos in the video. The music video was released on September 18, 2012.

As of April 2021, the video has over 60 million views on YouTube.

Remix
Shortly before their set at Rock the Bells' San Francisco Bay area on Sunday night, Bone Thugs-n-Harmony said they were appreciative of Game's new single which samples both their music and stylings.
"I feel like any song that we do that someone remixes we may have looked at as being disrespectful back when we were young and getting in the game," Wish Bone said from the tour stop in Mountain View, California. "But us being in the game for 20 years and younger cats coming up behind us doing our style, a style that we invented, that's kind of a compliment."
Game posted a picture on his Twitter showing the word "bone" structured with cannabis. Game later confirmed that he is working in the studio with Bone Thugs-n-Harmony on a remix for "Celebration". On October 28, an official remix, featuring all five members of Bone Thugs-n-Harmony was released by Game. It was positively received by the critics. The Game and the Bone Thugs filmed a music video for the track on November 14, 2012 in Los Angeles.

Charts

Weekly charts

Year-end charts

Credits and personnel
Sample
Contains elements from the composition "1st of tha Month" written by Bone Thugs-n-Harmony and produced by DJ U-Neek.

Radio and release history

References

External links
 Making of Celebration Music Video

Songs about cannabis
2012 singles
The Game (rapper) songs
Chris Brown songs
Tyga songs
Lil Wayne songs
Wiz Khalifa songs
Songs written by Lil Wayne
Song recordings produced by Sap (producer)
Interscope Records singles
2012 songs
Songs written by Tyga
Songs written by Chris Brown
Songs written by Wiz Khalifa
Songs written by The Game (rapper)
Song recordings produced by Cool & Dre